Fabriciano Sigampa (15 September 1936 – 31 March 2021) was an Argentine Roman Catholic archbishop.

Sigampa was born in Argentina and was ordained to the priesthood in 1970. He served as bishop of the Roman Catholic Diocese of Reconquista, Argentina from 1985 to 1993 and as bishop of the Roman Catholic Diocese of La Rioja, Argentina from 1993 to 2006. He served as archbishop of the Roman Catholic Archdiocese of Resistencia, Argentina, from 2006 to 2013.

Notes

1936 births
2021 deaths
21st-century Roman Catholic archbishops in Argentina
Roman Catholic archbishops of Resistencia
Roman Catholic bishops of La Rioja
Roman Catholic bishops of Reconquista